Follo Arbeiderblad was a Norwegian newspaper, published in Ski in Akershus county.

Follo Arbeiderblad was from 1923 as the Communist Party organ in the region Follo. It was issued twice a week. From January 1924 it got a new name, Akershus Folkeblad, tried to cover Akershus and was published three times a week. It soon returned to two times a week, and went defunct altogether after its last issue on 23 July 1924.

References

1924 disestablishments in Norway
Communist Party of Norway newspapers
Defunct newspapers published in Norway
Mass media in Ski, Norway
Norwegian-language newspapers
Publications disestablished in 1924
Publications with year of establishment missing